Thomas Anderson (November 29, 1905 – January 12, 1996) was an American stage and television actor.

He was born on November 29, 1905, in Pasadena, California and died on January 12, 1996, in Englewood, New Jersey.

Filmography
East Side/West Side (1963) - TV series, episode "No Hiding Place"
The Learning Tree (1969) - Pastor Broadnap
The Legend of Nigger Charley (1972) - Shadow
Shaft's Big Score! (1972) -  Preacher
Don't Play Us Cheap (1973) - Mr. Percy
Benny's Place (1982) - Isaac
South Bronx Heroes (1985) - Tony's Grandfather

External links

1905 births
1996 deaths
American male stage actors
American male television actors
20th-century American male actors
Federal Theatre Project people